Potamonautes gerdalensis is a species of crustacean in the family Potamonautidae. It is found in the Democratic Republic of the Congo, Kenya, Tanzania, and Uganda. Its natural habitats are rivers and freshwater lakes. It is threatened by habitat loss.

References

Potamoidea
Freshwater crustaceans of Africa
Crustaceans described in 1955
Taxonomy articles created by Polbot